Kathrinstadt Airport  is a private-use airport located eight miles (11 km) southeast of the central business district of Hastings, a town in St. Johns County, Florida, United States. It is approximately 25 miles southwest of St. Augustine.

The airport is modeled after a 1920s-1930s style aerodrome.

It is the maintenance airfield for Aeromarine West Indies Airways, a scheduled passenger seaplane service and aviation center.

Facilities and aircraft 
Kathrinstadt Airport has one runway (9/27) with a grass surface measuring 700 x 120 ft. (230 x 37 m). The runway can only be used by STOL aircraft and ultralights. Access is restricted to aircraft which receive landing clearance from the airport manager. The airport is attended 7 days a week, 24 hours a day. There is one maintenance hangar located at the center/north side of the runways.

References

External links 

Airports in Florida
Transportation buildings and structures in St. Johns County, Florida